Ismael Cortinas is a town in the Flores Department of Uruguay.

Geography
The town is located on the junction of Route 23 with Route 12, at southwest edge of the department and borders the departments of Soriano, Colonia and San José. The Grande River (Uruguay) (Spanish: Arroyo Grande) runs near the town.

History 
It was declared "Pueblo" (village) on 18 October 1950 by the Act of Ley N° 11.607, and named after Ismael Cortinas, a Deputy, Senator, journalist and playwright. Its status was elevated to "Villa" (town) on 15 November 1963 by the Act of Ley N° 13.167.

Population
In 2011 Ismael Cortinas had a population of 918.
 
Source: Instituto Nacional de Estadística de Uruguay

Places of worship
 St. John the Baptist Chapel (Roman Catholic)

See also 
 Ismael Cortinas (Uruguayan politician)#Disambiguation and legacy
 Geography of Uruguay

References

External links
INE map of Ismael Cortinas

Populated places in the Flores Department